November 23 - Eastern Orthodox liturgical calendar - November 25

All fixed commemorations below are observed on December 7 by Eastern Orthodox Churches on the Old Calendar.

For November 24, Orthodox Churches on the Old Calendar commemorate the Saints listed on November 11.

Feasts

 Afterfeast of the Entry of the Most Holy Theotokos into the Temple.

Saints

 Hieromartyr Clement, Pope of Rome (101) (see also:  November 23 - Western Orthodox use. And: November 25 - Russian use)
 Great-martyr Mercurius of Caesarea in Cappadocia (259)  (see also: November 25 - Greek)
 Saint Hermogenes, Bishop of Agrigentum (c. 260) or (c.824)
 Martyrs Procopius and Christopher, by the sword (274)
 Great-martyr Catherine of Alexandria (305)  (Russia only. See also: November 25 - rest of Orthodox Church)
 Martyrs Augusta (Faustina) the Empress, Porphyrius Stratelates, and 200 soldiers at Alexandria with Great-martyr Catherine (305)  (Russia only - see also: November 25 - rest of Orthodox Church)
 Martyrs Philoumenos and Christopher, by the sword. 
 Martyr Eugene (Eugenios), buried alive inside a wall.
 Martyr Chrysogenes (Chrysogonos), in Aquileia in Italy, under Diocletian (4th century)
 Hieromartyr Peter, Archbishop of Alexandria (311)
 Martyr Alexander at Corinth (360)
 Martyr Theodore, at Antioch, by beheading (361)
 Venerable Karion of Scetis (4th century) (see also: December 5)
 Venerable Malchus of Chalcis in Syria (5th century)  (see also: March 26)
 Venerable Mark of Triglia. 
 Venerable Gregory, monk of the monastery of the Golden Rock (Chryse Petra) in Pontus.

Pre-Schism Western saints

 Saint Felicissimus, a martyr who suffered in Perugia in Italy, probably under Diocletian (c. 303)
 Saint Firmina, a virgin-martyr in Amelia (America) in Umbria under Diocletian (c. 303)
 Saint Crescentian, a martyr in Rome with Sts Cyriacus, Largus and Smaragdus, under Maxentius (309)
 Saint Protasius, Bishop of Milan (352)
 Saint Romanus of Le Mans (Romanus of Bordeaux), a Gallo-Roman priest who converted the pagans living at the mouth of the Gironde (385)
 Saint Minver (Menefrida), Virgin of Cornwall (5th century).
 Saint Kenan (Cianan), first bishop in Ireland to build his Cathedral, at Damleag or Duleek in Meath, of stone (c. 500)
 Venerable Portianus of Arthone, a slave who became a monk and then Abbot of Miranda in Auvergne in France (527 or 533)
 Saint Colmán of Cloyne, first Bishop of Cloyne (c. 600)
 Saint Leopardinus, monk and Abbot of St Symphorian of Vivarais in Berry in France, murdered and venerated as a martyr (7th century)
 Saint Bieuzy, born in Britain, he followed St Gildas to Brittany and was martyred there (7th century)
 Saint Eanflæd (Eanfleda), daughter of the holy King Edwin of Northumbria and St Æthelburh of Kent, Abbess at Whitby Abbey jointly with her daughter Ælfflæd (c. 700)
 Saint Marinus, a monk at Maurienne in Savoy, and afterwards a hermit near the monastery of Chandor where he was martyred by the Saracens (731)
 Saints Flora and Maria, two virgin-martyrs in Cordoba in Spain who gave themselves up to the Moors and were beheaded by order of Abderrahman II (851)

Post-Schism Orthodox saints

 Venerable Mastridia of Alexandria (1060)
 Martyr Philothea of Romania (1060) (see also: December 7)
 Hieromartyr Mercurius of Smolensk (1238)
 Venerable Luke, steward of the Kiev Caves (13th century)(see also: November 6)
 St. Nicodemus the Younger of Philokalos monastery in Thessaloniki (c. 1305)
 Venerable Mercurius, the Faster of the Kievan Caves, far caves (14th century)
 Venerable Simon, Abbot of Soiga Monastery, Vologda (1562)

New martyrs and confessors

 New Hieromartyr Eugraphus Evarestov, Archpriest (1919)
 New Hieromartyrs Eugene Yakovlev and Michael Bogoroditsky, Priests (1937)
 New Hieromartyrs Alexander Levitsky, Alexis Tyutyunov, John Nikolsky, Cornelius Udilovich, and Metrophanes Kornitsky, Priests (1937)
 Virgin-martyr Anysia (1937)

Other commemorations

 Repose of Elder Ephraim of Philotheou and Arizona (2019)

Icon gallery

Notes

References

Sources
 November 24 / December 7. Orthodox Calendar (PRAVOSLAVIE.RU).
 December 7 / November 24. Holy Trinity Russian Orthodox Church (A parish of the Patriarchate of Moscow).
 November 24. OCA - The Lives of the Saints.
 The Autonomous Orthodox Metropolia of Western Europe and the Americas (ROCOR). St. Hilarion Calendar of Saints for the year of our Lord 2004. St. Hilarion Press (Austin, TX). p. 88.
 The Twenty-Fourth Day of the Month of November. Orthodoxy in China.
 November 24. Latin Saints of the Orthodox Patriarchate of Rome.
 The Roman Martyrology. Transl. by the Archbishop of Baltimore. Last Edition, According to the Copy Printed at Rome in 1914. Revised Edition, with the Imprimatur of His Eminence Cardinal Gibbons. Baltimore: John Murphy Company, 1916. p. 362-363.
 Rev. Richard Stanton. A Menology of England and Wales, or, Brief Memorials of the Ancient British and English Saints Arranged According to the Calendar, Together with the Martyrs of the 16th and 17th Centuries. London: Burns & Oates, 1892. pp. 563–565.
Greek Sources
 Great Synaxaristes:  24 ΝΟΕΜΒΡΙΟΥ. ΜΕΓΑΣ ΣΥΝΑΞΑΡΙΣΤΗΣ.
  Συναξαριστής. 24 Νοεμβρίου. ECCLESIA.GR. (H ΕΚΚΛΗΣΙΑ ΤΗΣ ΕΛΛΑΔΟΣ). 
  24/11/2015. Ορθόδοξος Συναξαριστής. 
Russian Sources
  7 декабря (24 ноября). Православная Энциклопедия под редакцией Патриарха Московского и всея Руси Кирилла (электронная версия). (Orthodox Encyclopedia - Pravenc.ru).
  24 ноября по старому стилю / 7 декабря по новому стилю. Русская Православная Церковь - Православный церковный календарь на 2018 год.

November in the Eastern Orthodox calendar